Harry Rushton (born 13 November 2001) is an  international rugby league footballer who plays as a  or  forward for the Huddersfield Giants in the Betfred Super League.

He previously played for the Wigan Warriors in the Super League and the Canberra Raiders in the NRL. Rushton will join the Huddersfield Giants ahead of the 2023 Super League season.

Background
Rushton is of Irish descent.

Rushton played his amateur rugby league for the Shevington Sharks.

Career

2020
Rushton made his Super League debut in round 14 of the 2020 Super League season for Wigan against St Helens, losing 42–0 against a much more experienced squad.

2021
Rushton had joined the Canberra Raiders on a three-year deal starting from the 2021 season. He played 10 games in Canberra's NSW Cup team in 2021, playing six games in the second row, three at lock and one at prop - before the season was cancelled due to the COVID pandemic.

2022
In round 7 of the 2022 NRL season, Rushton made his club debut for Canberra in their 36-6 loss against Penrith. On 12 August 2022, it was announced that Rushton would be joining Huddersfield Giants for 2023, after mutually agreeing to his release from Canberra Raiders.

References

External links
Canberra Raiders profile
Wigan Warriors profile
Ireland profile

2000 births
Living people
Canberra Raiders players
English people of Irish descent
English rugby league players
Huddersfield Giants players
Ireland national rugby league team players
Rugby league second-rows
Rugby league locks
Rugby league players from Blackpool
Wigan Warriors players